Christ Church is a Gothic Revival Anglican church located in Innishannon, County Cork, Ireland. It was completed in 1856. It is part of the Bandon Union of Parishes, in the Diocese of Cork, Cloyne, and Ross. The building is listed on Cork County Council's Record of Protected Structures.

History 
Christ Church replaced an earlier, 18th century church dedicated to St Mary. The church was constructed between 1854 and 1856. It was consecrated in 1856.

Christ Church is a constituent church of the Bandon Union of Parishes, of which Denic MacCarthy is the canon.

Architecture 
Christ Church was designed by Joseph Welland, and is built in the Gothic Revival style. It was built by either James Hunter, or James Turner. The church is composed of a four-bay buttressed nave, a two-stage tower, a gabled porch, a transept, and a vestry.

The stained-glass altar window was designed by Henry Holiday, and the west window designed by Heaton, Butler, and Bayne.

References

Notes

Sources 

Architecture in Ireland
Churches in the Diocese of Cork, Cloyne and Ross
19th-century Church of Ireland church buildings
Gothic Revival church buildings in the Republic of Ireland
19th-century churches in the Republic of Ireland